Kohgiluyeh and Boyer-Ahmad Province (Ostān-e Kohgīlūye va Būyer-Ahmad ) (Luri:
استان کهگیلویه و بِیرَمَد, Ostān-e Kohgīlūya-vo Beyramad) is one of the 31 provinces of Iran. It is in the southwest of the country, in Iran's Region 2, and its capital is Yasuj. The province covers an area of 15,563 square kilometers, and in 2006 had a population of 621,428 in 125,779 households. According to the National Population and Housing Census, the population of Kohgiluyeh and Boyer-Ahmad province in 2011 was 658,629 in 156,176 households. The latest census in 2016 counted 713,052 inhabitants in 186,320 households. The people mainly speak the Luri language.

Geography 

Kohgiluyeh and Boyer-Ahmad province is located in the south of Iran, and shares borders with five provinces: Isfahan and Fars provinces to the east, Bushehr province to the south, Khuzestan to the west and Chaharmahal and Bakhtiari to the north.

The province is mostly mountainous in terrain, part of the Zagros range. The highest point is the Dena summit with a height of 5,109 metres. The mountain range of Dena, which reaches an elevation of 4,000 metres, is located in the province, and is covered with oak forests. Another mountain is Khamin or Khami, which is located in Gachsaran County.

Administrative divisions

Cities 

According to the 2016 census, 397,461 people (over 55% of the population of Kohgiluyeh and Boyer-Ahmad province) live in the following cities: Basht 10,764, Charam 15,218, Chitab 1,164, Dehdasht 57,036, Dishmok 5,791, Dogonbadan 96,728, Garab-e Sofla 545, Landeh 12,772, Likak 19,857, Madavan 18,078, Margown 3,135, Pataveh 2,284, Qaleh Raisi 3,269, Sarfaryab 1,995, Sisakht 7,855, Suq 6,438, and Yasuj 134,532.

Colleges and universities 
 University of Yasuj
 Islamic Azad University of Gachsaran
 Yasuj University of Medical Sciences

See also 
 Seyyed Nasir Hosseini (the representative of Guardianship of the Islamic Jurist, in the province)

References

External links 

 Official website of Kohgiluyeh and Buyer Ahmad Governorship
 A Boyer-Ahmad-i folk-song sung by Shusha Guppy in the 1970s: Girl from Boyer-Ahmad-i Tribe.

 

Provinces of Iran